The IIFA Award for Best Director is chosen by the viewers and the winner is announced at the ceremony. The nominations for the category are given by the film fraternity. Sanjay Leela Bhansali has 4 and Rajkumar Hirani with 3 awards. Rakesh Roshan and Ashutosh Gowariker has the most wins with 2 awards.

The winners are listed below:-

See also 
 IIFA Awards
 Bollywood
 Cinema of India

External links
 Official site

International Indian Film Academy Awards